Tsapournia may refer to a number of places in Greece:

Tsapournia, Achaea, a village in Erymanthos.
Tsapournia, Euboea, a village in Istiaia-Aidipsos.
Tsapournia, Larissa, a village and a community in Elassona.